Pen-y-Bont may refer to:

 Pen-y-bont, an area at the edge of Bala lake in Snowdonia where the River Dee leaves the lake 
 Bridgend, a town in south Wales with the Welsh name Pen-y-bont ar Ogwr
 Penybont, a village in the Ithon valley in Powys, Wales
 Pen-y-Bont railway station, a station serving Penybont village
 Pen-y-bont Llanerch Emrys, a hamlet in the Tanat Valley, Powys, Wales
 Pen-y-bont-fawr, in Powys, Wales, a village in the Tanat Valley near to Llangynog